Parliamentary elections for the Croatian Parliament were held on 17 and 18 June 1887 in the Kingdom of Croatia-Slavonia. The People's Party won the elections with 87 out of 110 seats. Elections in 3 districts were suspended.

Results

References

Elections in Croatia
Croatia
Elections in Austria-Hungary
1887 in Austria-Hungary
June 1887 events
Kingdom of Croatia-Slavonia
Election and referendum articles with incomplete results